A composite boson is a bound state of fermions such that the combination gives a boson. Examples include Cooper pairs, semiconductor excitons, mesons, superfluid helium, Bose–Einstein condensates, atomic bosons, and fermionic condensates. A composite particle containing an even number of fermions is a boson, since it has integer spin. These composite particle states have a symmetric wave function upon exchange of any pair of particles. The wave function is given by the permanent of single particle states for the non interacting case.

See also 

 Composite fermion

References

 University of Colorado (January 28, 2004). NIST/University of Colorado Scientists Create New Form of Matter: A Fermionic Condensate. Press Release.
 Rodgers, Peter & Dumé, Bell (January 28, 2004). Fermionic condensate makes its debut. PhysicWeb.
 Haegler, Philipp, "Hadron Structure from Lattice Quantum Chromodynamics", Physics Reports 490, 49-175 (2010) 

Bosons